Isma is a genus of butterflies.

ISMA can refer to:
 L’Institut Supérieur des Métiers de l’Audiovisuel (ISMA), an African Higher Education Institute based in Benin.
 The Ikatan Muslimin Malaysia (ISMA), a Malaysian NGO
 The Indian Summer Music Awards, a component of Indian Summer Festivals in Milwaukee, WI
 The Information Systems Management Architecture
 The International Securities Market Association
 The International Security Managers Association
 The International Stress Management Association
 The International Supermodified Association, a sanctioning body in modified racing
 The Internet Streaming Media Alliance
 The International Space Monkey Alliance, a grassroots organization
 Esmaël Ruti Tavares Cruz da Silva Gonçalves, a Bissau-Guinean professional footballer